Marquis Dai of Cai (蔡戴侯) (?–750 BC; his name is lost to history) was the tenth ruler of the State of Cai from 760 BC to 750 BC.  He was the only known son of Marquis Gòng of Cai (蔡共侯), his predecessor. His reign lasted for 10 years. He was succeeded by his son.

References
Shiji
Chinese Wikipedia

Zhou dynasty nobility
Cai (state)
8th-century BC Chinese monarchs